The "Chicken Dance", also known and recorded as Der Ententanz, Tchip Tchip, Vogerltanz, the Bird Song, the Chicken Song, the Birdie Song, the Bird Dance, Danse des Canards, the Duck Dance, El Baile de los Pajaritos, Il Ballo del Qua Qua, Check Out the Chicken, or Dance Little Bird, is an oom-pah song; its associated fad dance is now a contemporary dance throughout the Western world. The song was composed by accordion player Werner Thomas from Davos, Switzerland, in the 1950s.

The Chicken Dance is a well-known drinking and dancing song at American Oktoberfest events. It is also a popular dance at weddings, particularly in the regions of Texas that were settled by German and Czech immigrants, and who retain a strong love of polka music. Over 140 versions have been recorded worldwide, including some that were released by Walt Disney Records, together making an estimated 40,000,000 records or more pressed.

Composer credits and publishing rights

The original name of the song was "Der Ententanz" (The Duck Dance), composed by the Swiss accordionist Werner Thomas in 1957. He played it in restaurants and hotels from the 1950s through the 1960s.

During one of Thomas' performances, the Belgian music producer Louis van Rymenant heard the song. Van Rymenant had some lyrics created and in 1970 released it to the public through his publishing company Intervox Music (later co-publishing with his other company Eurovox Music) without much success. It first became a world-wide hit from 1980 through 1982, and was recorded in many countries.

On some recorded releases of the music Werner Thomas is listed as the sole composer, while on others other composers are listed, e.g., as "Thomas/Rendall/Hoes." The name Renell refers to Van Rymenant, who was listed as co-author under the pen name of Terry Rendall. The name Hoes refers to the Dutch singer/producer Johnny Hoes, who re-arranged the song for the Electronicas recording (which was released on Hoes' own record label, Telstar Records).

Eurovox Music now manages the publishing rights worldwide, except for the US (September Music), UK (Valentine Music) and the Netherlands (Benelux Music), sub-publishers.

Description of the dance

The origin of the dance moves set to the music is not known.

The piece is often notated in cut time and the key of C major. It begins with repeated dominant chords before moving into the main theme. The secondary theme features a contrasting rhythm. The two themes alternate. In some versions tempo shifts are introduced to confuse and amuse the dancers, and the final repetition of the main theme is often played as one continuous accelerando.

The dance step has five discrete moves. The first four moves are done in place and are repeated throughout each verse:
 The dancer lifts both hands into the air and opens and closes them as if operating a hand puppet (simulating a chicken's vocalizations) four times, twice on each beat;
 The dancer pulls their hands into their underarms and flaps them like a chicken four times, twice on each beat;
 The dancer wiggles their shoulders and/or hips (tail feathers) while descending downward for two beats;
 The dancer claps four times.

The fifth move persists throughout the refrain and involves the dancer and a partner.

 The pair may lock arms, facing opposite directions, and spin. They may switch arms and directions (and sometimes partners) halfway through the refrain. 
 The pair may "swing out," by holding hands, leaning back, and rotating in place, first clockwise and then counterclockwise. 
 If performed in a circle dance or square dance formation, the entire group of participants may simply rotate the circle in one direction, then shift direction halfway through the refrain, or they may perform an allemande at the command of a caller.

The performance of one or more dancers in bird costumes leading a crowd in the dance is quite common. A 1981 video recording of the Tweets performing the song before a live television audience in the UK shows all of the "musicians" in large, mascot-style bird costumes, miming to the recording, while a group of British teens perform the dance in a line behind them. Since then, many state fairs, Oktoberfests, German culture festivals, and even weddings feature at least one dancer in a bird costume. The live performances by Bob Kames throughout the upper Midwest during the 1980s and 1990s almost always featured bird-costumed dance leaders.

Lyrics 

European versions of the song from the 1980s often have complete sets of lyrics, but British, Canadian, American, and Australian versions are generally instrumentals, although there may be very simple lyrics such as, With a little bit of this, And a little bit of that, You shake your tail, And then you clap.  Alternative lyrics are "I don't want to be a chicken, I don't want to be a duck, So I wiggle my butt, Quack, quack, quack, quack!"

At American Oktoberfests that feature live band performances, the hand and body gestures are usually performed without lyrics, but the four hand-claps may be accompanied by the rowdily shouted words, "We want more beer!"

Notable recordings and title changes

 In 1981, Henry Hadaway produced a version of the song, which was released in the United Kingdom as an instrumental novelty tune "The Birdie Song" by The Tweets. It peaked at number two on the UK Singles Chart in October 1981, making it the most popular version. A 1981 video shows bird-costumed dancers miming as instrumentalists while the recording plays and young people dance on stage. This may be the earliest recording of the dance and hand-clapping. In 2000, this version was voted "the most annoying song of all time" in a poll commissioned for the website dotmusic.
 In 1981, the Spanish accordionist María Jesus Grados Ventura, better known as María Jesús y su Acordeón, released the song as "El Baile de los Pajaritos." This version included Spanish lyrics in both the verses and refrain.
 In 1981, the song was recorded and released in Finland by Frederik under the name "Tralalala"
 In 1981 the Italian musicians Al Bano and Romina Power recorded it as "Il ballo del Qua Qua."
 In 1981 a French recording by René Simard and Nathalie Simard was released under the title "La Danse des Canards."
 In 1982, the music producer for the Milwaukee-based organist and polka composer Bob Kames first heard "Dance Little Bird" at a German music fair.  The producer sent Kames a copy, and Kames recorded his own version on the Hammond organ, as "Dance Little Bird" or "The Chicken Dance"  and released it that same year.  The Kames recording hit solid gold when it was released in 1983 in Poland, selling 300,000 copies.  Kames received 2 of the 35 cents from each sale.  Since he could not take the money out of the country, he donated all of it to for a relief fund.  The success of the song stunned Kames.  He commented in a 1995 interview, "This stupid little thing, it's infectious.  It has only two chords, it doesn't even change for the bridge.  It implants the melody in people's minds—it just sticks in there.  That's gotta be the secret...It just keeps on going.  People come up to me at jobs and tell me how happy it makes them.  You get a song like this once in a lifetime." Kames became known as "The Chicken Dance King" and performed the song live at hundreds of festivals with fellow musicians like Lawrence Welk and Frank Yankovic, as well as his own children, Bob Jr. and Barbara Kames.
 In 1982, the polka-themed cover band "The Emeralds", from Edmonton, Alberta, Canada, released their version on K-Tel records. The album that included it, "Bird Dance," was advertised heavily on television, and the ad featured a bird-costumed dancer among a group performing the dance. The album went double-platinum in Canada, and gold in Australia. The song also contributed to the success of multiple gold albums for the Emeralds in 1983 and 1984.
 In 1990 an electronic remix was released by the Belgian band Brussels Sound Revolution as "La Danse Des Canards / De Vogeltjesdans".
 In 1990, the Dutch band Grandmaster Chicken and DJ Duck released the song as "Check Out the Chicken", which peaked at number 16 in Australia.

Notable live performances 

 In 1981, the song and its dance were performed during the Tulsa, Oklahoma Oktoberfest. A local television station provided a chicken costume for the use of a dancer at the festival, in keeping with the costumed performances by The Tweets in England, and this costume is said to have been what gave the "Chicken Dance" its American name.
 On 13 November 2009, CIHT-FM played the Chicken Dance continuously until 389 tickets for the CHEO Dream of a Lifetime were purchased at CA$100 each, to support the Children's Hospital of Eastern Ontario. This played for over 3 hours.
 On 23 April 2010, in a fund raiser for Helen DeVos Children's Hospital, an attempt at the world's largest chicken dance record was held at Byron Center, Michigan at Jake's restaurant, the site of a giant plastic chicken sculpture.
 During the 2015–16 season, NHL club Philadelphia Flyers had the chicken dance played over the PA system at the Wells Fargo Center every time the Flyers scored four goals in that game.  The Flyers had a partnership with Chick-Fil-A where customers could get free breakfast sandwiches from Chick-Fil-A the day after every game where the Flyers scored four goals or more.

In popular culture 

 In 2001, the song was heard in the film Jimmy Neutron: Boy Genius.

See also
 Schuhplattler

References

Novelty songs
Songs about birds
Novelty and fad dances
Number-one singles in Germany
Line dances
1950s songs
Compositions in C major